Maygag Qabcalle is an unpopulated locality in the north-central Mudug region of Somalia.

References
Maygag Qabcalle

Mudug